The 142nd Georgia General Assembly succeeded the 141st and served as the precedent for the 143rd General Assembly in 1995. The 142nd General Assembly of the U.S. state of Georgia convened its first session in January 1993, at the Georgia State Capitol in Atlanta.

Members of the State Senate

Members of the House of Representatives

See also

Georgia Senate
Georgia House of Representatives

External links
Georgia General Assembly website 
 Members of the General Assembly of Georgia, Senate and House of Representatives - First Session of 19893-94 Term
Official Georgia Government Publications - Library - Link to "Picture Book"

Georgia (U.S. state) legislative sessions
1993 in American politics
1994 in American politics
1993 in Georgia (U.S. state)
1994 in Georgia (U.S. state)